An annular solar eclipse occurred on December 25, 1935. A solar eclipse occurs when the Moon passes between Earth and the Sun, thereby totally or partly obscuring the image of the Sun for a viewer on Earth. An annular solar eclipse occurs when the Moon's apparent diameter is smaller than the Sun's, blocking most of the Sun's light and causing the Sun to look like an annulus (ring). An annular eclipse appears as a partial eclipse over a region of the Earth thousands of kilometres wide.
This was the 5th solar eclipse in 1935, the maximum possible. The next time this will occur is 2206.

Related eclipses

Solar eclipses 1935–1938

Saros 121

Tritos series

Metonic series

Notes

References

1935 12 25
1935 in science
1935 December 25
December 1935 events